Alice Beer (born 17 May 1965) is an English television presenter and consumer journalist. She is best known for appearing on the British consumer investigative journalism programme Watchdog on BBC One between 1993 and 1999, and as the consumer presenter on This Morning since 2014.

Career
Beer trained as a primary school teacher from 1983 to 1987 at Roehampton Institute of Higher Education but her first job in 1987 was as a secretary on the BBC programme That's Life! She was later a researcher, then a producer, on Kilroy and Gloria Live. From 1992 until 1999 she was co presenter on the BBC consumer programme Watchdog with Anne Robinson. After leaving Watchdog she appeared on programmes including Healthcheck, Face Value and Real Rakeovers, as well as reporting for Holiday and Summer Holiday. She has also appeared as herself on Bremner, Bird and Fortune.

She was a regular presenter on The Heaven and Earth Show, and during two series of Hot Property for Five. She currently presents a programme for BBC London 94.9. Between December 2004 and February 2005, she presented a promotional video for Top Up TV. The looped film ran 19 hours each day on the Top Up TV Sampler channel. The channel was replaced by Xtraview before closing altogether in September 2005.

Beer also appears on This Morning.  She has been with the programme since 2014.

In September 2021, Beer revealed on This Morning that she is a qualified teacher.

Personal life
Beer and her husband Paul Pascoe live in Wiltshire, and have twin daughters, Phoebe and Dora, born in 2003.

References

External links

1965 births
Living people
English television presenters
BBC newsreaders and journalists
People educated at North London Collegiate School
People from Bushey